Maurice Garçon (25 November 1889 in Lille – 29 December 1967 in Paris) was a French novelist, historian, essayist and lawyer. A major figure at the bar, he gained a certain notoriety and was even mentioned with  René Floriot in the last phrase of Jean-Pierre Melville's film "Bob le flambeur".

Biography

Legal Pleadings
Plaidoyer pour René Hardy (1950) (Plea for René Hardy)
Plaidoyer contre Naundorff (1955) (Plea against Naundorff)
En marge de l'Immortel : un procès d'archéologie (1932) (On the Sidelines Of The Immortal: A Trial of Archaeology)
En marge des fleurs du mal: un procès littéraire (1926) (Alongside the Flowers of Evil: A Literary Process)

Works
Le Diable, étude historique, critique et médicale (in collaboration with Jean Vinchon) (1926)
La vie exécrable de Guillemette Babin, sorcière (1926)
Vintras, hérésiarque et prophète (1928)
Rosette Tamisier ou La miraculeuse aventure (1929)
Trois histoires diaboliques (1930)
Essai sur l’éloquence judiciaire (1931)
La justice contemporaine, 1870-1932 (1933)
La justice au Parnasse (1935)
Magdeleine de la Croix, abbesse diabolique (1939)
Huysmans inconnu, du bal du Château-rouge au monastère de Ligugé (1941)
Le douanier Rousseau, accusé naïf (1941)
Tableau de l’éloquence judiciaire (1943)
L’Affaire Girard (1945)
Sur les faits divers (1945)
13 drames du poison (1948)
Plaidoyer pour René Hardy (1950)
Procès sombres (1950)
Louis XVII ou La Fausse énigme (1952)
Sous le masque de Molière (1953)
Plaidoyers chimériques (1954)
La tumultueuse existence de Maubreuil, marquis d’Orvault (1954)
Plaidoyer contre Naundorff (1955) (Advocacy Cons Naundorff 
Choses et autres (1956) (Things and Others)
Histoire de la Justice sous la IIIe République (1957) (History of Justice Under the Third Republic)
Défense de la liberté individuelle (1957) (Defence of Personal Liberty)
Le journal d’un juge (1958) (Diary Of A Judge)
Le costume des avocats (1958) (The Suit Lawyers)
Histoires curieuses (1959) (Curious Histories)
Plaidoyer contre la censure, Jean-Jacques Pauvert (1963) on the trial of the Sade
L’Avocat et la morale (1963) (The Advocate and Morality)
Nouvelles histoires curieuses (1964) (Curious News Histories)
Lettre ouverte à la Justice (1966) (Open Letter To Justice)
Le Palais et l’Académie (1966) (The Palace and the Academy)

References 

1889 births
1967 deaths
Lawyers from Lille
20th-century French lawyers
20th-century French novelists
French male essayists
French male novelists
20th-century French historians
20th-century French essayists
20th-century French male writers